The Kent Royals (formerly Kings) are a British speedway team formed in 2013. Through 2021 they competed in the SGB Championship but also run a junior team in the National League. They were based at Central Park Stadium in Sittingbourne, with a track laid inside the greyhound racing track, but moved to the Iwade track and operated solely as a NDL team starting in 2022.

History
The Kings joined the National League (third division) in 2013, with the backing of sponsors CTA Fire. Len Silver co-promoted the team with Roger Cearns. Their participation during the 2013 National League speedway season saw the return of professional speedway to Kent for the first time since Canterbury Crusaders closed in 1987. The first match for the team was a challenge against the American Touring Team in May 2013, attended by more than 3,000 spectators. The Kings finished seventh out of eight teams and bottom of the National Trophy. However, the debut season for the Kings at Central Park saw some achievements, including second in the NL Fours (Steve Boxall, Benji Compton, Ben Morley and David Mason), third in the NL Pairs (Boxall and Morley), and third in the British Under 19 Championships (Ben Morley). Steve Boxall won the National League Riders Championship and finished as holder of the Bronze Helmet.

In 2014, the Kings finished third of the nine teams competing in the 2014 National League speedway season. This was enough for a play-off place, and in the home first leg of the semi-final against Coventry Storm, the Kings ran out 49–44 winners.  In the away leg, the Kings were beaten 54–39, with Coventry progressing to the final against Cradley. In the National Trophy, the Kings finished last of the four teams competing. Lambert and Morley finished third in the National League Pairs, and Morley finished third in the National League Riders Championships. In the National League Fours, Lambert, Morley, Ayres and Baseby fell agonisingly short in a last heat decider in the Semi-Final group.

From 2016 to 2019, a gradual improvement was experienced by the club, with three consecutive semi final play off appearances in 2016, 2017 and 2018. During the 2019 National Development League speedway season the team reached the play off final for the first time, losing to Leicester Lion Cubs in the final.

For the 2020 season Kent Kings entered the SGB Championship (division 2) for the first time and the club formed a junior team called the Kent Royals to compete in division 3 but the season was cancelled due to COVID-19. However the following season the Kings started in the SGB Championship 2021 and Royals competed in the NDL. In 2022, the team competed solely as the Royals in the NDL.

Season summary

Riders

2013 team

The team manager was John Sampford. David Mason was signed as captain, but lost his team place, with Steve Boxall taking over the captaincy. 

2014 team

The original 2014 line up was Simon Lambert, Luke Chessell, Ben Morley, Benji Compton, David Mason, Daniel Blake, and Brandon Freemantle. John Sampford was to remain in charge, but the highly respected former Isle of Wight manager and former rider Chris Hunt was appointed assistant manager.

Simon Lambert took over the captaincy from the returning David Mason and went on to score heavily throughout the season with a cavalier and exciting style. Daniel Blake retired after two meetings and was replaced by Luke Harris. Luke Harris was himself dropped from the team in June and was replaced by Jason Garrad. Brandon Freemantle was forced to bow out of the Kent Kings side in early May and his place was taken by a former motocross rider making his debut in speedway, Danny Ayres. The team was further disrupted when Benji Compton injured his hand as was ruled out in June. His place was taken by newcomer to the Kent side, Aaron Baseby. Compton made his return in July, with Luke Chessell being dropped.

2022 team & average

 12.00
 10.30
 10.00
 8.19
 6.14
 5.55
 4.22
 3.52
 2.61
 2.00

References

Sport in Sittingbourne
National League speedway teams
2013 establishments in England
Sports clubs established in 2013